Gelagna is a genus of predatory sea snails, marine gastropod mollusks in the family Cymatiidae.

Species
Species within the genus Gelagna include:
 Gelagna pallida (Parth, 1996)
 Gelagna succincta (Linnaeus, 1771)

References

External links
 Mörch, O. A. L. (1852-1853). Catalogus conchyliorum quae reliquit D. Alphonso d'Aguirra & Gadea Comes de Yoldi [.... Fasc. 1, Cephalophora, 170 pp. [1852]; Fasc. 2, Acephala, Annulata, Cirripedia, Echinodermata, 74 [+2] pp. [1853]. Hafniae [Copenhagen]: L. Klein. ]

Cymatiidae